Phil Gardner (born 29 July 1973) is a British writer, playwright and journalist. He lives in Brighton, East Sussex, where he writes regularly for The Argus website and The Kemptown Rag, based in the Kemptown district of Brighton

Early life
Phil Gardner was born in Hastings, East Sussex, and grew up in Basildon, Essex. He attended Kingswood Junior School, being appointed Head Boy in his final year, before passing the Eleven Plus and winning a place at Southend High School for Boys. Two years later he transferred to Woodlands School in Basildon, where he won the Headmaster's Award for English and founded the Woodlands School VIth Form Magazine, on which he acted as head writer.

The Poddington Peas
In 1992 Gardner was invited to write for the BBC's animated children's television show The Poddington Peas. He was involved in the development of two new sets of characters, The Bugz and The Freshwater Friends, which were intended to be introduced to an American audience under the title The Wonderful World of Poddington. The project, which was to be produced in conjunction with HIT Entertainment, was ultimately abandoned and no episodes featuring the new characters were ever made.

Plays
Gardner has written a number of plays, the first of which, Internet Cafe (2002) has also been turned into a movie screenplay. Be Worth It (2003) was acclaimed by both the Royal Court and the Soho Theatre in London, but perhaps his most successful play is Ledgers (2003), a one-act comedy taking as its theme the subject of depression and suicide, which has been performed in both the UK and US.

Micro Fiction
Gardner's Micro Fiction has won awards on both sides of the Atlantic, and has featured on the curriculum in a number of US high schools, as well as appearing on the Contemporary English syllabus at the University of Lyon in France.

Mirkin Topp
In November 2004, Gardner took part in the National Novel Writing Month, producing the fantasy novel Mirkin Topp and the Hair of the Dog. He has hinted at a sequel, Mirkin Topp and the Bee in the Bonnet, but this is believed to remain unwritten.

Television critic
For a period of eight months in 2005, Gardner wrote a series of humorous TV reviews on the subject of Reality Television. Entitled Telly Critic, these reviews were often scathing, yet Gardner has talked elsewhere of his great love of Reality TV. Telly Critic was brought to a close at the beginning of 2006, but Gardner has repeatedly raised the possibility of a return to this work in the future.

The Peter Marlin Story
In November 2006, the Hoax-Slayer website revealed Phil Gardner to be the author of The Peter Marlin Story, an elaborate online hoax written in 2004 and purporting to be a journalist's account of his dealings with a serial killer. Gardner has since admitted to its authorship on his own blog, and has also written of his mild loathing of the piece. The Peter Marlin Story is rare amongst his work for being devoid of any humour whatsoever.

Mulled Whines
Gardner's personal blog, Mulled Whines, gives a humorous and ironic account of his daily life, and has been running since January 2003. In September 2007 it was nominated for a Brighton Web Award.

Depression
Gardner suffered from clinical depression for much of the late 1990s and has written extensively about his experience of the illness and the prejudice encountered by its sufferers. He is an active supporter of Mind and has campaigned for the equal treatment of people with mental health problems, particularly in relation to employment.

External links
Phil Gardner's Website
Mulled Whines
Telly Critic
Mirkin Topp & the Hair of the Dog
The Peter Marlin Story
Phil Gardner at The Argus
The Kemptown Rag

References

1973 births
Living people
British bloggers
British comedy writers
British dramatists and playwrights
British male journalists
Fellows of the Royal Society of Literature
People educated at Southend High School for Boys
People from Basildon
People from Brighton
People from Hastings
British male dramatists and playwrights
Male bloggers